Macrothylacia is a genus of moths in the family Lasiocampidae described by Rambur in 1866.

Species
Based on Lepidoptera and Some Other Life Forms:

 Macrothylacia digramma Meade-Waldo, 1905 Iberia and Morocco
 Macrothylacia rubi (Linnaeus, 1758) – fox moth, distributed in Europe, central Asia and Siberia

References

External links
 

Lasiocampidae
Moth genera
Taxa named by Jules Pierre Rambur